Robert Garrett (born 18 March 1977 in Ochsenfurt, Bavaria) is a former German professional basketball player. From 1996 to 2002 Garrett played with DJK Würzburg where he was a teammate of Dirk Nowitzki. Before transferring to Bayern Munich he played for the Brose Baskets of the 1st Division. He is 1.92 m (6 ft 3 ¾ in) in height and he weighs 98 kg (215 pounds). Garrett was also a member of the German national basketball team. He competed at the 2008 Olympic Games.

References

1977 births
Living people
Basketball players at the 2008 Summer Olympics
Brose Bamberg players
FC Bayern Munich basketball players
German men's basketball players
German people of British descent
Olympic basketball players of Germany
People from Ochsenfurt
Sportspeople from Lower Franconia
Shooting guards
Skyliners Frankfurt players
Teramo Basket players
2006 FIBA World Championship players